PyLadies is an international mentorship group which focuses on helping more women become active participants in the Python open-source community. It is part of the Python Software Foundation. It was started in Los Angeles in 2011. The mission of the group is to create a diverse Python community through outreach, education, conferences and social gatherings. PyLadies also provides funding for women to attend open source conferences. The aim of PyLadies is increasing the participation of women in computing. PyLadies became a multi-chapter organization with the founding of the Washington, D.C., chapter in August 2011. The group currently has more than 40 chapters around the world.

History 
The organization was created in Los Angeles in April 2011 by seven women: Audrey Roy Greenfeld, Christine Cheung, Esther Nam, Jessica Venticinque (Stanton at the time), Katharine Jarmul, Sandy Strong, and Sophia Viklund. Around 2012, the organization filed for nonprofit status.

As of November 2022, PyLadies has over 100 chapters.

About
PyLadies has conducted outreach events for both beginners and experienced users. PyLadies has conducted hackathons, social nights and workshops for Python enthusiasts.

Each chapter is free to run themselves as they wish as long as they are focused on the goal of empowering women and other marginalized genders in tech. Women make up the majority of the group, but membership is not limited to women and the group is open to helping people who identify as other gender identities as well.

References

External links
PyLadies Website

Mentorships
Women in computing
Free and open-source software organizations
Organizations for women in science and technology
Software developer communities
Python (programming language)